Shine Tidelands State Park is a  Washington state park located in Jefferson County,  south of Port Ludlow. The park has  of shoreline on Bywater Bay adjacent to the west end of the Hood Canal Bridge and offers activities including picnicking, fishing, shellfish harvesting, beachcombing, birdwatching, windsurfing, and wildlife viewing. In 2014, the park was expanded to include the former Wolfe and Point Hannon properties.

References

External links
Shine Tidelands State Park Washington State Parks and Recreation Commission

Parks in Jefferson County, Washington
State parks of Washington (state)
Protected areas established in 1967